Wolf Messing: Who Saw Through Time — Russian TV series about fate of Wolf Messing, based on the novel of the same name by the screenwriter Eduard Volodarsky. by the Russia-1 TV channel. The series premiered on the Russia-1 on November 15, 2009.

Plot 
Messing was born in the last year of the nineteenth century and became one of the most mysterious and fateful personalities of the twentieth century. A boy from a poor Jewish family, he was forced to start an independent life early. After leaving for Germany, he took on the most menial work. His supernatural telepathic abilities were discovered quite accidentally, by two Jews, under almost mystical circumstances (one of them, the doctor, discovered that the "dead" boy was not dead). They also begin to promote him as an artist, and Messing spends his first public performances in the Berlin Panopticon. The audience remains in awe. Weimar Germany, scarred by the consequences of the First World War, was a place that attracted charlatans and mystics, great scientists and maniacs.

Soon the chaos of the Weimar Republic is replaced by the iron system of Nazi Germany. And here Messing is in demand as never before. In 1937, when the Third Reich is at the height of its glory, Messing predicts a swift and inglorious end to the "millennial Reich" in the event of an attack on the East. Believing in their own prediction, with Hitler's capture of Poland Messing crosses the border The Soviet Union. So life for him was divided into two equal halves.

In the Soviet Union, Wolf Messing is listed as a hypnotist and magician, being both an experimenter and a test subject, and unofficially becomes an astrologer of Stalin. He holds secrets that no one can share, secrets that will die with him.

Actors and roles 
 Evgeny Knyazev — Wolf G. Messing
 Alexander Khinkis — Wolf Messing as a child
 Roman Grechishkin — Wolf Messing in his youth
 Alexander Klyukvin — Ilya Petrovich
 Tara Amirkhanova — Aida Mikhailovna Messing-Rappaport, Messing's wife
 Veronika Itskovich — Sarah, Messing's mother
 Vasily Savinov — Gregory, Messing's father
 Mikhail Gorevoy — Eric Hanussen
 Vladimir Dolinsky — Peter Zellmeister, Messing's impresario
 Andrey Ilyin — Albert Einstein
 Boris Plotnikov — Sigmund Freud
 Vitaly Kudryavtsev — Konstantin Kovalev, pilot
 Yuri Nifontov — Dr. Karl Abel
 Ivan Agapov — Dr. Lev Kobak
 Roman Pechersky — Paul Vogt
 Viktor Rakov — Wilhelm Canaris
 Mark Rudinstein — Osip Yefremovich
 Alexey Petrenko — Joseph Stalin
 Georgy Teslya-Gerasimov — Vasily Stalin
 Vladimir Shcherbakov — Lavrentiy Beria
 Vladimir Chuprikov — Nikita Khrushchev
 Oleg Chernihiv — Leonid Brezhnev
 Sarkis Amirzyan — Anastas Mikoyan
 Sergey Klanovsky — Mikhail Suslov
 Dmitry Yachevsky — Adolf Hitler
 Vasily Belokopytov — NKVD agent
 Yuri Shlykov — Viktor Abakumov
 Lyubov Rumyantseva — Raisa Andreyevna
 Pyotr Yurchenkov Jr. — cadet of the intelligence school
 Alexander Luchinin — Military
 Edita Herbus — Anna Vogt
 Andrey Podubinsky — episode

Film crew 
 The author of the script: Eduard Volodarsky
 Directors: Vladimir Krasnopolsky, Valery Uskov
 Director of Photography: Timur Zelma
 Composer: Evgeny Shiryaev
 Artists:
 Ivan Rogoten
 Vladislav Travinsky
 Producers:
 Anatoly Chizhikov
 Sergey Danielyan
 Aram Movsesian
Ruben Dishdishyan

Criticism 
In general, the plot of the film is completely based on the legendary and not reliably confirmed biography of Messing. Shows meetings (which most likely didn't happen in reality) with Einstein, Freud, Hanussen, By Hitler and Stalin, shows Messing's alleged escape from a German prison by hypnotizing the guards, etc., which was noted by many critics of the film. In addition, there are many historical and visual inaccuracies in the film, including Messing's date of birth itself.

"In 2009, unexpectedly good ratings were given to the artistically insignificant series Wolf Messing: Who Saw Through Time. Venerable screenwriter Eduard Volodarsky collected all the legends and myths about the Honored Artist of the RSFSR Wolf Grigoryevich Messing-a mentalist who performed in the USSR with psychological experiments "on reading the thoughts" of the audience. Directors Uskov and Krasnopolsky put all the crazy stories up to Messing's acquaintance with Freud, Einstein, Hitler and Stalin on the screen. They swindled the "mentalist" almost to the scale of a biblical prophet..." (Alexander Kondrashov, Leningrad State University, 2013)

Plagiarism 
In the series, music from the soundtracks to other films was used (not specified in the credits).
 The theme of the title credits of the third season of the TV series "Babylon 5" (by composer Christopher Franke) — accompanied by the closing credits of each episode;
 Theme from the kiss scene of Zhou Chang and Harry Potter from the movie "Harry Potter and the Order of the Phoenix" (by composer Nicholas Hooper) — in scenes where Messing shows his abilities.

References 

Russia-1 original programming
2007 television films
2007 films